Esther Montelius born 4 May 1871, died 12 December 1948, was a Swedish author who was employed as a telegraph clerk at Stockholm Telegraph Station's branch at Södermalmstorg 26.

Biography
Montelius was born on 4 May 1871, as the daughter of the mill owner G. G. D. Montelius, and Margaretha Christina Segerberg. Her first book, Adolfsfors, is a sentimental and romanticized description of Adolfsfors' mill in Värmland. The work was published in several editions during the 1920s.
Parts of it may have been co-written with Frida Åslund.
Montelius is buried at Norra begravningsplatsen in Stockholm.

Works
Adolfsfors. An old Värmland farm and its mill patrons. Romanticized depiction., Åhlén & Åkerlunds förlag, 1920
The legacy: an old family history from the shores of Lac Léman, Åhlén & Åkerlund's publisher, 1926

References

1871 births
1948 deaths
Swedish writers
Swedish women writers